Andrew Mutambo Sinkala (born 18 June 1979) is a Zambian former professional football midfielder. From 1999, he was exclusively under contract with clubs in Germany.

Club career
After his retirement from professional football, Sinkala continued to play amateur football for SG Köln-Worringen in the sixth-tier Landesliga Mittelrhein.

International career
Sinkala captained the Zambia U-20 national football team to both the African Youth Nations Youth World Cup in Nigeria in 1999. He also won his first senior cap in the same year against Democratic Republic of the Congo in an Africa Cup of Nations qualifier.

He represented the Zambian national team at the Africa Cup of Nations in 2000, 2002, 2006 and 2010.

Personal life
His late father, Moffat Mutambo, also played for Nchanga Rangers and the national soccer team as a defender. Sinkala's brother, Nathan Sinkala, is also a football player and has also played for Zambia.

Honours
 DFB-Ligapokal winner: 1999, 2000

References

External links
 

Living people
1979 births
People from Chingola
Association football midfielders
Zambian footballers
Zambia international footballers
Zambian expatriate footballers
Nchanga Rangers F.C. players
FC Bayern Munich footballers
FC Bayern Munich II players
1. FC Köln players
SC Paderborn 07 players
FC Augsburg players
FC Viktoria Köln players
Bundesliga players
2. Bundesliga players
Expatriate footballers in Germany
2000 African Cup of Nations players
2002 African Cup of Nations players
2006 Africa Cup of Nations players